Ausra might refer to:
 Ausra, a former name of Areva Solar, an American power company
 Ausra Fridrikas (born 1967), Austrian handball player

Aušra is Lithuanian word for "dawn" and may refer to:
 Aušra, a Lithuanian newspaper
 Aušra, Kėdainiai, village in Lithuania
 Aušra, Lithuanian pagan goddess of dawn (see List of Lithuanian gods)
 Aušra Augustinavičiūtė (1927–2005), Lithuanian psychologist
 Aušra (given name)